Jagannath Hall of Dhaka University is a residence hall for minority students, Hindu, Buddhist, Christian, and others. It is one of the three original residence halls that date from when the university was founded in 1921, and like them is modelled on the colleges of the University of Oxford, a complex of buildings including residences, meeting rooms, dining rooms, a prayer hall, gardens, and sporting facilities. Of the approximately 2000 students of the hall, half live in the residences, and half are non-residential students affiliated with the college. Several professors at the university hold the positions of house tutors and provost at the hall.

The hall includes four residential buildings:
 Govinda Chandra Dev building
 Sontosh Chandra Bhattacharya Bhavan (New Building) 
 October Memorial Building (October Smiriti Bhaban)
 Jyotirmoy Guhathakurta building

History

Kisorilal Roy Chowdhury, the Zamindar of Baliati in Saturia, Manikganj, who had previously established Jagannath College named after his father Jagannath Saha, also established this hall of University of Dhaka.

University of Dhaka was established in 1921 as a merger of the two institutes of higher learning that existed in the city at that time, Dhaka College, a government institution, and Jagannath College, which was privately funded. With the Jagannath College Act of the Indian Legislative Council (Act No XVI of 1920), that college was renamed as Jagannath Intermediate College, and the second- and third-year students (303 in all) were transferred to University of Dhaka the following year, along with many teachers and equipment such as library books. Two residence halls at Dhaka University were then named after the contributing colleges: Jagannath Hall and Dhaka Hall (since renamed Dr Muhammad Shahidullah Hall).

The first Provost of this hall was Professor Naresh Chandra Sengupta, who served from 1921 to 1924. Other famous provosts include philosopher Govinda Chandra Dev (who served from 1957 to 1970) who was murdered by the occupying Pakistani army in 1971, along with the then current provost Professor Jyotirmoy Guhathakurta.

25 March 1971

After midnight on 25 March 1971 the campaign of genocide against intellectuals by the Pakistani army took place in the Dhaka University area. Jagannath Hall could not be defended against this action, and many residential students and employees were killed on that night. Professor Jyotirmoy Guhathakura and Professor Govinda Chandra Dev, the former and current provosts, were also murdered at their apartments on Secretariat Road.

1985 Jagannath Hall tragedy
On 15 October 1985, a tragic accident occurred when the roof of the ancient assembly building of Jagannath Hall collapsed. It killed 39 people, students, employees and guests. Since then the day is observed as a day of mourning for the university. In 1988 the building was reconstructed as a residential building, and named October Memorial Building.

References

Buildings and structures in Dhaka
Buddhism in Bangladesh
Christianity in Dhaka
Hinduism in Bangladesh
University and college residential buildings
University of Dhaka halls of residence